Street is an English surname, deriving from the Old English word stræt via the ancient Latin strata, referring to a Roman road.

People with the surname
Adrian Street (born 1940), Welsh wrestler
Alan Street (born 1982), British figure skater
Alfred Street (cricket umpire) (1869–1951), English cricketer 
Alfred Billings Street (1811–1881), American poet
Andy Street (born 1963), British politician
Anne Penfold Street (1932–2016), Australian mathematician
Anthony Austin Street (1926–2022), Australian politician
A. G. Street (1892–1966), British farmer, writer and broadcaster
Cecil Street (1884–1964), British MI7 officer and novelist
Chris Street (1972–1993), American basketball player
Craig Street, American record producer
Danny Street (1941–2010), Scottish singer
David Street (1917–1971), American actor and singer
Deborah Street (born 1957), Australian statistician
Gabby Street (1882–1951), American baseballer and broadcaster
Geoffrey Austin Street (1894–1940), Australian politician
George Edmund Street (1824–1881), British architect
Huston Street (born 1983), American baseballer
Ian Ewen-Street (born 1949), New Zealand politician
Jack Street (footballer, born 1928) (1928–2019), English footballer for Tranmere Rovers
Jack Street (footballer, born 1934), English footballer for Bradford City
James Street (quarterback) (1948–2013), American footballer 
James Street (cricketer) (1838–1906), English cricketer 
James H. Street (1903–1954), American theologian
Janet Street-Porter (born 1946), British journalist and broadcaster
Jessie Street (1889–1970), Australian feminist
John Street (disambiguation), several people, including
John Street (footballer, born 1926) (1926–1988), English footballer for Liverpool
John Street (Australian politician) (1832–1891), MP for East Sydney
John Street (snooker referee) (1932–2009), British snooker referee
John Alfred Street (1822–1889), British Army general
John Ambrose Street (1795–1865), Canadian lawyer and politician
John F. Street (born 1943), American lawyer and mayor of Philadelphia
Cecil John Charles Street (1884–1964), British MI7 officer and novelist
Joseph M. Street (1782–1840), US Army general
Julian Leonard Street (1879–1947), American author
Sir Kenneth Whistler Street (1890–1972), Australian judge
Kentavius Street (born 1997), American football player
Sir Laurence Whistler Street  (1926–2018), Australian judge
Maryan Street (born 1955), New Zealand politician
Mel Street (1933–1978), American country music singer
Milton Street (1941–2022), American politician
Nic Street (born 1979), Australian politician
Norman Street (cricketer) (1881–1915), English soldier and cricketer
Sir Philip Whistler Street (1863–1938), Australian judge
Picabo Street (born 1971), American skier 
Richard Street (1942–2013), American soul and R&B singer
Sandy Street, Australian judge and naval commander
Sarah Street (born 1958), British academic
Sharif Street (born 1974), American politician
Sharon Street (born 1973), American philosopher
Stephen Street (born 1960), British music producer
Steve Street (born 1950), American politician
Thomas Street (astronomer) (1621–1689), English astronomer
Sir Thomas Street (1625–1696), English judge
Thomas Clark Street (1814–1872), Canadian politician
Tony Street (1926–2022), Australian politician

Fictional characters
Della Street, secretary of Perry Mason in the original novels and their radio and TV adaptations
Jason Street, quarterback of the Dillon Panthers in the American TV series Friday Night Lights

Street family of Australia
Street family, Australian dynasty

See also
George Streets (1893–1958), English footballer
Will Streets (1886–1916), English soldier and poet of the First World War

References

English-language surnames